Wild America may represent:

 Wild America (TV series), a science TV series focusing on animal life
 Wild America (film), a 1997 film
 Wild America (album), an album by the rock group Tora Tora
 "Wild America", a song by Iggy Pop off his American Caesar album